Karla Moreno Rodríguez  (born March 15, 1988, in Managua) is a weightlifter from Nicaragua.

At the 2008 Pan American Weightlifting Championships she won bronze in the 48 kg category, with a total of 143 kg.

She competed at the 2008 Summer Olympics, in the weight class of -48 kg, where she finished in 11th place, with a total of 150 kg.

References

External links
 Athlete bio at 2008 Olympics site

1988 births
Living people
Sportspeople from Managua
Weightlifters at the 2008 Summer Olympics
Olympic weightlifters of Nicaragua
Nicaraguan female weightlifters